Smithtown is a station on the Port Jefferson Branch of the Long Island Rail Road. It is located off a low bridge over NY 25 – 25A along Redwood Lane between NY 25-25A and Landing Avenue in Smithtown, New York.

History
Smithtown station was originally built in 1872 by Charles Hallett of Riverhead for the Smithtown and Port Jefferson Railroad. In 1937, the station was rebuilt, and the grade crossing at Main Street (NY 25/NY 25A) immediately west of the station was eliminated. A freight spur exists west of the bridge under Brooksite Drive.

The station contains a mural along the track side of the station called "Nissequogue Passages," by Robert Carioscia, which was sponsored by the Smithtown Township Arts Council in 1989.

Station layout
This station has two high-level side platforms, each 12 cars long. On either end of the station, however, the tracks merge. Therefore, most trains utilize Platform B, with select trains using Platform A to allow two trains to bypass each other through the station.

References

External links
 

Smithtown Station from NY 25-25A Bridge; Winter 1984
Smithtown Station from NY 25-25A Bridge; December 6, 2006
POST Interlocking (The LIRR Today)
Smithtown, Long Island, Train Station (Maggie Blanck.com)
 Main Street entrance from Google Maps Street View

Long Island Rail Road stations in Suffolk County, New York
Smithtown, New York
Railway stations in the United States opened in 1872
1872 establishments in New York (state)